Mohamed Irfaan Ali (born 25 April 1980) is a Guyanese politician who has served as the tenth and current president of Guyana since 2020. He is the first Muslim to hold the office, along with being the second Muslim head of state in the Americas after Noor Hassanali of Trinidad and Tobago.

Ali was a member of parliament (MP) and the minister of housing before becoming the presidential candidate of the People's Progressive Party/Civic (PPP/C) in the March 2020 general election. He was sworn in as Guyana's tenth president on 2 August 2020, after months of legal challenges regarding the integrity of the election and even a consequential recount of all ballots.

Early life and education 

Ali was born to an Indo-Guyanese Muslim family in Leonora, a village in the West Coast Demarara region of Guyana. The child of two educators and one of two sons, Ali also spent many of his formative years on the island of Leguan. He is a former student of the Leonora Nursery and Primary schools and Cornelia Ida Primary. Ali completed his secondary education at St. Stanislaus College in Georgetown, Guyana. He holds a doctorate in Urban and Regional Planning from the University of the West Indies. In 2003, he completed his Master’s Degree in Human Resource Planning Development from the National Institute of Labour Economics, affiliated with the Guru Gobind Singh Indraprastha University, New Delhi and in 2023 the University also awarded him with an Honorary Doctorate.

Professional career 

Ali served as project manager of the Caribbean Development Bank's Project Implementation Unit in the Ministry of Finance and senior planner in the State Planning Secretariat.

Early political career 

Ali became a member of the National Assembly of Guyana in 2006. He was subsequently appointed to the portfolios of minister of housing and water and minister of tourism industry and commerce.

During his tenure as minister, Ali performed the functions of president and prime minister on separate occasions. In 2015, the People's Progressive Party/Civic (PPP/C) went into opposition during which time he served as chair of the Public Accounts Committee and co-chair of the Economic Services Committee of the parliament of Guyana.

Presidency

Candidacy 

Irfaan Ali was the presidential candidate of the People's Progressive Party (PPP/C) for the 2 March 2020 general and regional elections in Guyana. He was selected as the presidential candidate for the People's Progressive Party/Civic on 19 January 2019. His selection came at a time after Ali had been charged with 19 counts of conspiracy and fraud by Guyana's Special Organized Crime Unit (SOCU). Ali's lawyers questioned the legality of these charges, and claimed that they were political in nature and "trumped up". At the time when Ali was running for president, the charges had never been brought to a full court hearing. 

Immediately following his selection, Ali was accused of academic fraud, with opponents claiming that when Ali was in his early 20s, he had misrepresented one of his qualifications. Ali was also indicted on 19 charges of other fraud for allegedly defrauding the state of over $174M between the period 2011 and 2015, allegedly conspiring with persons unknown to "greatly undersell" 19 plots of state lands at Plantation Sparendaam and Goedverwagting in Demerara-Mahaica to current or former government officials. The trial on the matters was postponed several times. He was granted self bail on the charges. The lands, which were sold for $39.8M, are valued at $212.4M, according to the Special Organized Crime Unit (SOCU). On 14 August, the charges were dismissed.

Campaign 

In his campaign for the presidency, Ali ran on a mainly economic platform, citing declining growth and increased joblessness under the Granger administration. Ali committed to creating 50,000 new jobs over five years. He has emphasized the need for transparency and adherence to globally-recognised standards of governance for Guyana's nascent oil sector, which is expected to transform Guyana's development. Ali is committed to establishing a sovereign wealth fund protected against political interference, and to strengthen Guyana's ability to uphold the Santiago Principles and the global requirements of the Extractive Industries Transparency Initiative.

Foreign policy

United States

In September 2020, in a joint statement with the United States secretary of state Mike Pompeo, Ali said the two countries would begin joint maritime patrols aimed at drug interdiction near Guyana's disputed border with crisis-stricken Venezuela. The agreement came as U.S. oil major Exxon Mobil Corp, as part of a consortium with Hess Corp, ramped up crude output from Guyana's massive offshore Stabroek block, a large portion of which is in waters claimed by Venezuela. Pompeo and Ali added that "greater security, greater capacity to understand your border space, what's happening inside your Exclusive Economic Zone - those are all things that give Guyana sovereignty."

Honours and awards 
Ali is a recipient of the following honours:
 In 2023, the Government of India conferred the Pravasi Bharatiya Samman (Overseas Indian Award) to Ali in recognition of his contribution in "Politics/Community Welfare" and for "outstanding achievements both in India and abroad".

Notes

References

External links 

 Office of the President of Guyana

1980 births
Living people
Presidents of Guyana
Government ministers of Guyana
Guyanese politicians of Indian descent
People from Essequibo Islands-West Demerara
University of the West Indies alumni
People's Progressive Party (Guyana) politicians
Guyanese Muslims
Muslim socialists